Jusmadi (born 19 October 1983) is an Indonesian footballer that currently plays for Persela Lamongan in the Indonesia Super League.

Career

Persib Bandung
In 2009, he played for Persib Bandung in the Indonesia Super League in 2009–2010 Season.

Persela Lamongan
In 2014, he played for Persela Lamongan in the 2014 Indonesia Super League.

Gresik United
In September 2016, 18th season, he was loaned to Gresik United from Persela Lamongan.

References

External links 
 

1983 births
Living people
Indonesian footballers
Sportspeople from East Kalimantan
People from Bontang
Liga 1 (Indonesia) players
Persib Bandung players
Persela Lamongan players
Association football defenders
Association football midfielders